A. giganteus may refer to:
 Amphicyon giganteus, an extinct large carnivorous bone crushing mammal species from the middle Oligocene and early Miocene
 Antarctosaurus giganteus, an extinct titanosaurian sauropod dinosaur species from the Late Cretaceous Period of what is now South America